Ænigma is the third album by Norwegian progressive death metal band In Vain. It was released on March 11, 2013 by Indie Recordings. The album was recorded at the Strand Studio, in Kristiansand, between September and December 2012. The album was mixed and mastered in Fascination Street Studios in Sweden.

The special edition of the album contains the bonus track "Rise Against". This is the first album to feature guitarist Kjetil D. Pedersen as a full-time member, as he were featured as a guest on Mantra.

Track listing
From Metal Archives.

Credits

Band members
From Metal Archives.
 Johnar Håland - Guitars & Backing vocals
 Sindre Nedland - Lead vocals, Backing vocals, Organ & Piano
 Andreas Frigstad - Lead vocals
 Stig Reinhardtsen - Drums
 Kristian Wikstøl - Bass guitar, Hardcore vocals (on track 5) & Backing vocals
 Kjetil D. Pedersen - Guitars & Backing vocals

Guest musicians
From Metal Archives.
 Lars A. Nedland - Vocals (track 2)
 Simen H. Pedersen - Vocals (track 5)
 Audun Barsten Johnsen - B3 Hammond organ
 Cornelius Jakhelln - Poetry recital (track 5 & "Rise Against")
 Åge Jan Barlund - Trombone
 Line Falkenberg - Saxophone
 Jan Ragnar Storheim - Cello
 Ingvild Anette Strønen Kaare - Violin
 Charlotte Winsvold - Trumpet

Production
From Metal Archives.
 Jens Bogren - Mixing, Producer
 Tony Lindgren - Mastering
 Marius Strand - Engineering & Producer
 Robert Høyem - Cover art
 Jorn Veberg - Photography
 Simen H. Pedersen - Recording (hardcore vocals of Kristian Wikstøl)

References

2013 albums
In Vain (band) albums
Albums produced by Jens Bogren